Schuyler Thomas VanValkenburg (born 1982) is an American teacher and politician. He won election to the Virginia House of Delegates from the 72nd District, on November 7, 2017, to replace retiring delegate Jimmie Massie. He defeated Republicans Eddie Whitlock and GayDonna Vandergriff to take the seat in the 2017 and 2019 elections, respectively.

Career
VanValkenburg taught at Short Pump Middle School and continues to teach at Glen Allen High School after his election to the House of Delegates, a part-time legislature. A Democrat, he defeated Republican lawyer Edward Whitlock III in 2017 as part of a Democratic wave in Virginia.

VanValkenburg has introduced twelve education-related bills since taking office.

Committee assignments
Education
Privileges & Elections

Legislative issues

Education 

VanValkenburg, a public school teacher for 18 years, has stated that investing in education has been one of his top legislative priorities. He aims to bring more state aid to local school divisions in order to reduce class size, expand support staff and modernize school buildings.

Labor relations 

VanValkenburg opposes the use of covenants not to compete (also known as non-compete agreements) in certain cases, such as for relatively low-wage workers or workers who do not have access to sensitive trade secrets, such as sandwich-makers, baristas, or gym trainers. He filed a bill in 2019 which would prohibit employers from enforcing non-compete agreements when no trade secrets were involved. VanValkenburg's bill would apply only to workers whose average weekly earnings were less than the state's average weekly wage.

Civil liberties 

In 2019, VanValkenburg announced a bill to reform Virginia's anti-strategic lawsuit against public participation (SLAPP) laws. VanValkenburg's proposed bill came after Virginia's anti-SLAPP laws, which were intended to protect people from being intimidated or silenced by frivolous lawsuits) were criticized for being overly lax, allowing plaintiffs such as actor Johnny Depp and California Congressman Devin Nunes to file lawsuits in Virginia that may have been dismissed under California's more stringent laws. VanValkenburg's bill, modeled after California's, would allow defendants in defamation cases to file motions to dismiss potentially-frivolous defamation suits earlier in the process. If successful, they would be able to recover attorney fees.

Electoral history

References

External links 
Schuyler VanValkenburg - Delegate for Virginia's 72nd District in Henrico County.

1984 births
Living people
Schoolteachers from Virginia
Democratic Party members of the Virginia House of Delegates
Virginia Commonwealth University alumni
University of Richmond alumni
21st-century American politicians